Caquena is a village in the Arica and Parinacota Region, Chile.

Climate
According to the Köppen climate classification, Caquena has a cold tundra climate (ET) with wet summers and dry winters. The diurnal range is high year-round.

References

Populated places in Parinacota Province